Manticore is 2022 psychological drama thriller film directed and written by Carlos Vermut which stars Nacho Sánchez and Zoe Stein.

Blending mumblecore and tragedy characteristics as well as dealing with the protagonist's hamartia, the plot follows the romantic relationship of a video game designer (Sánchez) with an art history student (Stein), whom with the former thinks to have at last a chance for happiness and for placating his recently awakened dark impulses.

Manticore world premiered at the 2022 Toronto International Film Festival. It scooped 4 nominations to the 37th Goya Awards (Director, Original Screenplay, Leading Actor, and New Actress).

Plot 
Living alone in an appartment in the centre of Madrid, Julián is a successful video game designer who creates monsters for a living with assistance from VR tools. A fire in the appartment next-door upends him. A kid (Cristian) is trapped inside and is thereby saved by Julián. After receiving light medical attention, Julián befriends Cristian. They talk about what Cristian wants to be when he grows up. Despite his musical hobby, Cristian wants to become a gardener. Julián tells him that he wanted to be a tiger when he was little. Back to his appartment, Julián cannot fall asleep, and has a panic attack. The physician prescribes him anxiolytics and recommends him to talk to others. Julián has a bad sex experience with a girl he meets in a bar. He develops further interest in Cristian's physical features and, upon human NPC templates obtained from the company he works for and a hand-drawn sketch of the boy, Julián begins to reproduce Cristian on VR, getting aroused by the result of his work. At a party held for one of his work colleagues (Sandra), Julián meets Diana, a boyish girl studying a degree on art history by distance learning, and whom with he starts a slow-burn relationship after meeting again near the Filmoteca. Julián removes any trace of his work on Cristian and commits to Diana. Diana came to Madrid from Barcelona to take care of her father in the wake of the latter suffering a stroke. Upon sexually opening to Julián in the new appartment Julián has rented in the outskirts of Madrid, Diana gets the news concerning the sudden death of her father. Julián visits the funeral home to console Diana. Unwilling to engage to her mother, Diana travels to her father's seaside hometown in Catalonia together with Julián. Julián has another panic attack there and is soothed by Diana.

Julián is summoned to a company meeting. He is disclosed that, pursuant to his contract with the company, the management had a register of all works developed with the company's tools, thus having the power to know about the full extent of Julián's virtual portfolio. Julián tries to communicate to Diana by phone. Diana ghosts him. Set on talking to her, Julián takes Japanese food to Diana's home. Julián tells her that he has never harmed anybody. He is rejected by Diana, who dismisses him as a disgusting being upon knowing about the boy and tells him to leave. Julián leaves and cries. An altered and anxious Julián arrives to his former appartment building and communicates with Cristian via the gate intercom. Aware of the fact that Cristian's mother is out and the boy is home alone, he manages to get into Cristian's appartment. He prepares him a colacao, pouring drugs in one of the mugs. They drink and Julián requests him to play a musical piece. Cristian falls asleep and Julián takes him to his bedroom. Torn about his next step, Julián sees a Cristian's drawing on the wall displaying a tiger with a human head, named 'Julián'. Julián gets out of the bedroom, opens the living room's window and attempts suicide by defenestration. Julián wakes up in a hospital room. The physician tells him that he has suffered severe spinal cord damage and endured several surgical procedures. Julián is also told thad Diana has been with him during the time he was unconscious. The fiction ends with Diana entering her appartment and taking care of a paralytic Julián, addressing him in Catalan.

Cast

Production 

The screenplay was penned by Carlos Vermut. The project was motivated as an adaptation of classic werewolf films, upon the premise that they originally sought to depict "humans managing forbidden sexual desires", with the fiction thereby approaching the theme of pedophilia as a curse, likewise portraying ways about how a pedophile may try to "cheat" on that forbidden impulse with proxies (such as VR or a substitutive target being a child look-alike) in current-day society. Vermut told that the original idea for the film came from the story of a lesbian friend somewhat resembling Justin Bieber who felt used in a relationship because she found out that the aforementioned look-alike was the reason for which her partner was with her.
Vermut stated that "I think it is my film with the highest levels of discomfort. I like to confront the things that scare me through film. And I guess looking Julián in the eye is a way of dealing with it".

The film makes references to Francisco de Goya's Black Paintings as well as to Alfonso Ponce de León, somewhat alluding to the tragedy awaiting for the protagonist.

Alana Mejía González took over cinematography duties for the first time in a feature film. The film was produced by Aquí y Allí Films, Bteam Prods, Magnética Films, Punto Nemo AIE, Estonia's 34t Cinema, with the participation of TV3, RTVE, and Movistar Plus+. Filming began on 27 May 2021 in Madrid. It was also shot in locations of the Great Penedès, Catalonia. Shooting had already wrapped in July 2021.

Release 
The film was slated to make its world premiere at the 47th Toronto International Film Festival on 13 September 2022, screened within the 'Contemporary World Cinema' selection. It will later have its US premiere at the Austin-based Fantastic Fest. It also made it to the slate of the 66th BFI London Film Festival and the 55th Sitges Film Festival, as well as the 35th Tokyo International Film Festival (for its Asian premiere). Distributed by BTeam Pictures, it was set for a 4 November 2022 theatrical release date in Spain, and then re-scheduled to 9 December 2022. Film Factory handles the international sales elsewhere.

Reception 
According to the review aggregation website Rotten Tomatoes, Manticore has a 100% approval rating based on 7 reviews from critics, with an average rating of 9.8/10.

Shelagh Rowan-Legg of ScreenAnarchy deemed Manticore to be "brutal, unflinching, precise, and sensitive", cannot helping to be "equal parts horrified and mesmerized" with the story.

Alfonso Rivera of Cineuropa pointed out that, possible objections by some viewers about an "amoral or scandalous" nature notwithstanding, the story manages to address the issue of "the need for affection that we all have", wondering if this is "the most brilliantly contrived and terrible love story in cinema today".

Raquel Hernández Luján of HobbyConsolas rated the film with 75 out of 100 points ("good"), writing that Vermut delivers "a disconcerting film at times, suffocating at others, in which you never know what might happen and you are permanently on guard" as well as highlighting a "very intelligent" mise-en-scène that helps to "demonstrate that it is not necessary to be excessively explicit in order to enter into the most obsessive, deep and disconcerting corners of people".

Manu Yáñez of Fotogramas rated the film 5 out of 5 stars, assessing that Vermut reneges on the aesthetic pirouettes and narrative twists present in his previous films, otherwise highlighting "the sobriety of the scenic and writing work".

Daniel de Partearroyo of Cinemanía rated Manticore 5 out of 5 stars, describing the film as "a hair-raising character study grappling with taboo and horror at the blackness before one's own soul", as well as Vermut's "most polished and daring film to date".

Quim Casas of El Periódico de Catalunya rated the film 4 out of 5 stars, describing it as "a complex and problematic film, because what it talks about is always problematic", as well as, more than simply unsettling, "[an] uncomfortable, restive, and discomfort- and uneasiness-inducing [viewing]".

Luis Martínez of El Mundo rated the film 5 out of 5 stars, deeming it to be "a prodigious film with a structure that is as simple as it is dense" as well as the "consummation of a filmography now stripping itself of the juggling of [Vermut's] previous works".

Wendy Ide of ScreenDaily underscored the film to be "a provocative and intelligently handled picture which explores the impact of isolation and social dislocation on a troubled soul".

Top ten lists 
The film appeared on a number of critics' top ten lists of the best films of 2022;

In addition, it also appeared on top ten lists of the best European films of 2022;

As well as in best Spanish films of 2022 top ten lists:

Accolades 

|-
| align = "center" | 2022 || 28th Forqué Awards || Best Film Actor || Nacho Sánchez ||  || 
|-
| rowspan = "14" align = "center" | 2023
| rowspan = "4" | 15th Gaudí Awards || colspan = "2" | Best Non-Catalan Language Film ||  || rowspan = "4" | 
|-
| Best New Performance || Zoe Stein || 
|-
| Best Cinematography || Alana Mejía González || 
|-
| Best Costume Design || Vinyet Escobar || 
|-
| rowspan = "3" | 10th Feroz Awards || Best Main Actor in a Film || Nacho Sánchez ||  || rowspan = "3" | 
|-
| Best Film Poster || Carlos Vermut || 
|-
| Best Trailer || Miguel Ángel Trudu || 
|-
| rowspan = "3" | 78th CEC Medals || Best Director || Carlos Vermut ||  || rowspan = "3" | 
|-
| Best Actor || Nacho Sánchez || 
|-
| Best New Actress || Zoe Stein || 
|-
| rowspan = "4" | 37th Goya Awards || Best Director || Carlos Vermut ||  || rowspan = "4" | 
|-
| Best Original Screenplay || Carlos Vermut ||  
|-
| Best Actor || Nacho Sánchez ||  
|-
| Best New Actress || Zoe Stein ||  
|}

See also 
 List of Spanish films of 2022

References

External links 
 Manticore at ICAA's Catálogo de Cinespañol
 

Films shot in Madrid
Aquí y Allí Films films
Spanish thriller drama films
2020s Spanish films
2020s Spanish-language films
Films about pedophilia
Films about virtual reality
2022 romantic drama films
Spanish romantic drama films
Estonian drama films
Estonian thriller films
2020s psychological drama films
2022 psychological thriller films
Films set in Madrid
Films shot in the province of Barcelona